Palkulangara Devi Temple (Malayalam: പാല്‍കുളങ്ങര ദേവി ക്ഷേത്രം) is a Hindu temple in Palkulangara, Thiruvananthapuram, Kerala, India. This place is around 1 km from  Pettah Junction, 700 m from West Fort Junction and 1.5 km from Chakka bypass Junction. It is about 1.5 kilometres to the west of Sree Padmanabhaswamy Temple in Thiruvananthapuram city. Now the temple is under the control of Sree Palkulangara Devi Temple Trust. The temple is an excellent example of Kerala Vasthu Vidya. The abode of Sree Palkulangara Devi is one of the most ancient temples in Kerala, which preserves the beauty and atmosphere gifted by nature. A kavu is also there in the temple.

Locate

Coordinates - 8°29'15"N   76°56'1"E

History

Legend has it that the main deity was installed by Arjuna. After installing the deity, Arjuna sent an arrow to the ground and it made way to a pond of milk, and the milk from the pond was used for Abhisheka. Palkulangara means the banks of the pond of milk(Pal - Milk, Kulam - Pond, Kara - Banks). The pond in the back of the temple.

Ancient Recordings

This temple is also recorded in the stories of Nala and Damayanti. There is a section in which Nala asks his messenger swan to visit Palkulangara Devi and take the blessings of the Goddess en route to delivering the messages to his lady love Damayanti. The existence of this temple is recorded in many ancient scriptures.

Deities and Sub-Deities

The Goddess Parvati in Her manifestation as Goddess Tripura Sundari along with Goddess Kali are the main deities in this temple. One important aspect of the temple is that the Goddess Durga manifests as the Temple Bhagavathi and Kali as Oorutu Amma, both being avatars of Adi Parashakti. Karthika is considered as the star of the deity.

There are many upadevathas (sub-deities) adjacent to the temple, and it has been remade, according to the Deva Prashnam by expert astrologers recently.

The main upadevathas on the premises are

 Lord Ganesh
 Lord Shiva as the All Father. 
 Nagaraja
 Nagayakshi
 Lord Ayyappan
 Brahma Rakshasa
 Veerabhadra as the brother of the main deity.
 Navagraha
 Goddess Kali as Oorutu Amma, the Sister of the Main deity.

Darshan

 Morning - 5.30 to 10.00
 Evening - 5.00 to 8.00

Festivals

The festivals in this temple are:

 Meena Bharani Mahostav — Annual Festival that falls in the month of Meenam.
 Mandala Vratham — Festival in connection with the annual Utsavam of Sabarimala.
 Vinayaka Chathurthi — Pooja to the Lord Ganapathy.
 Pooja Vaypu — Identical to Dussera festival (Saraswathy Pooja and Vidyarambham).
 Karthika — Kazhchakula Samarpanam, Navakabhishekam, Karthika Pongala, Annadhanam (all months).
 Ayilya Pooja — Milk, flowers etc. offered to serpent god and special rites. Monthly Pooja in Ayilyam day except in the months of Mithunam and Karkidakom.
 Ayilyolsavam — Nagaroottu and Sarpabali in the month of Thulam
 Ramayana Parayanam and Bhagavathi Seva — All days of Karkidakom (evening).
 Vavu Bali — In the month of Karkidakom.

See also 
 Parvathi
 Irumkulangara Durga Devi Temple
 List of Hindu temples in Kerala
 Temples of Kerala

References

External links
 
 

Hindu temples in Thiruvananthapuram district
Devi temples in Kerala